is a Japanese freestyle skier. She competed at the 2002 Winter Olympics and the 2006 Winter Olympics.

References

1975 births
Living people
Japanese female freestyle skiers
Olympic freestyle skiers of Japan
Freestyle skiers at the 2002 Winter Olympics
Freestyle skiers at the 2006 Winter Olympics
Sportspeople from Miyagi Prefecture
Freestyle skiers at the 2003 Asian Winter Games
21st-century Japanese women